William Doud Packard (November 3, 1861 – November 11, 1923) was an American automobile manufacturer who founded the Packard Motor Car Company and Packard Electric Company with his brother James Ward Packard.

Life and career
Packard was born in Warren, Ohio on November 3, 1861, to Warren and Mary Elizabeth Doud Packard. While his younger brother James Ward Packard (1863-1928) joined him in founding the Packard Electric Company there in 1890 where they manufactured incandescent carbon arc lamps, his sister Alaska P. Davidson (1868-1934) later became the first female FBI agent.

After disappointment with a Winton Company car he purchased, James formed a partnership with his brother and Winton investor George L. Weiss called Packard & Weiss. The first Packard automobile was released in 1899. In 1900, the company incorporated as the Ohio Automobile Company and was renamed the Packard Motor Car Company in 1902. The company relocated to Detroit in 1903. The company eventually merged with the Studebaker Corporation in 1954, and the last Packard was made in 1958.

Following Packard Motor Company's relocation to Detroit, the Packard brothers focused on making automotive electrical systems through the separate Packard Electric Company. General Motors acquired Packard Electric in 1932, renaming it Delphi Packard Electric Systems in 1995. The company was spun off and became independent of GM in 1999.

In 1915, W.D. Packard commissioned a summer home to be designed by a famous architectural firm in New York City, Warren and Wetmore. This home is located on the Chautauqua Institution. It still serves as a single-family residence. There is a duplicate in Warren, Ohio.

Packard Park in Warren, Ohio is on land donated by Packard, and the W.D. Packard Music Hall and Packard Band were funded by him.

References

External links
William Doud Packard via Automotive Hall of Fame

1861 births
1923 deaths
People from Warren, Ohio
Packard people
American founders of automobile manufacturers
American automotive pioneers
Businesspeople from Ohio
19th-century American businesspeople
20th-century American businesspeople